The Wolf's Hour is a 1989 World War II horror novel by American writer Robert R. McCammon. It is the story of a British secret agent who goes behind German lines to stop a secret weapon from being launched against the Allies. This agent is a werewolf. The book also includes some of the agent's history, namely how he became a werewolf.

Plot summary
 
Michael Gallatin, a werewolf, is a British emigrant that is a top spy for Britain during World War II.  In 1942, he overtakes Rommel in North Africa and foils the Nazis plan to control the Suez Canal.  This vital waterway would ensure that Nazi Germany could choke off Allied shipping and continue their march east into Russia.  In 1944, the war still rages on and the Nazis are forced toward Berlin by the Soviets, but Western Europe is still in Hitler’s grip. Gallatin, in seclusion since 1942, is called back for a vital mission: the first part of the mission has him parachuting into Nazi-occupied France to retrieve vital information from an informant named Adam.  Adam is in Paris under tight Gestapo security (the Nazi’s official secret police).  

Gallatin contacts Adam through a Nazi deserter called “Mouse”.  He slips a note in Adams pocket that informs Adam to go to an opera at the third act, so Gallatin can receive the information.  The Gestapo had followed Adam and shoot him in the head just after the information was disclosed to Michael.  Michael escapes by faking suicide using cyanide; he does not swallow the pill.  This fake-out allots him time to turn into a werewolf and he kills the fleeing Gestapo.  Gallatin and Mouse must make their way east to Berlin, the heart of the Nazis lair, in an attempt to foil a top-secret Nazi plan, “Iron Fist”.

External links
Page at Internet Speculative Fiction Database

Werewolf novels
Novels set during World War II
1989 American novels